The Seventh Continent is a 1989 Austrian drama film directed by Michael Haneke. It is Haneke's debut feature film. The film chronicles the last years of an Austrian family, which consists of Georg, an engineer; his wife Anna, an optician; and their young daughter, Eva. They lead a seemingly routine urban middle-class life, but they are actually planning something sinister. The film was selected as the Austrian entry for the Best Foreign Language Film at the 62nd Academy Awards, but was not accepted as a nominee.

Plot
The film is divided into three parts. The first two, 1987 and 1988, each depict a day in the family's life, showing their daily activities in detail. It conveys their discomfort with the sterile routines of modern society. Toward the beginning of each part, there is a voice over of the wife reading a letter to the husband's parents informing them of his success at work. Many of the activities in the two parts are the same.

The third part, 1989, begins with the family departing from the grandparents' home after a visit. The husband then narrates a letter, written the next day, informing them that he and his wife have resigned from their jobs and decided "to leave". It plays over clips of them quitting, closing their bank account, telling the bank clerk they are emigrating to Australia, selling their car, and buying a large variety of cutting tools. He then says it was a very hard decision whether or not to take their daughter Eva with them, but they decided to do so after she said she was not afraid of death.

The family eats a luxurious meal and then systematically destroys every possession in the house, but in an automatic and passionless manner, with barely any speaking (as are almost all of their actions in the film). They rip up all of their money and flush it down the toilet. The only emotion shown is when Georg shatters their large fish tank, and his daughter screams and cries hysterically. Finally, they commit suicide by overdosing on pills dissolved in water, first Eva, then Anna, and finally Georg, who vomits up the liquid and must resort to injecting himself. Just before he dies, Georg methodically writes the names, date, and time of death of all three family members on the wall, providing a question mark for his own time of death. An envelope addressed to Georg's parents is taped to the door.

At the end of the film, text says that, despite the suicide note, Georg's parents thought it may have been a homicide and a police investigation was conducted. No evidence of murder was found.

Title
The film's title is a reference to Australia, the continent mentioned in the film as the family's destination. Its image is visualized as an isolated beach and desert, with a mountain range on the left border and pool of water with mysterious waves (which are clearly physically impossible) in between. Australia is symbolised as the ideal place to escape to for the doomed Austrian family. It appears in the first two parts and as the last image in a series of flashbacks shown before the death of Georg.

Background
Michael Haneke said that the film is based on a news article he read about a family who committed suicide in this manner; police discovered that their money was flushed because bits of currency were found in the plumbing. Haneke claims to have correctly predicted to the producer that audiences would be upset with that scene, and remarked that in today's society the idea of destroying money is more taboo than parents killing their child and themselves.

Reception
The film was awarded Bronze Leopard at the Locarno International Film Festival and the prize for Best Application of Music and Sound in Film at the Ghent International Film Festival. It has a weighted average of 89/100 on Metacritic, and a 67% approval rating on Rotten Tomatoes.

See also
 List of submissions to the 62nd Academy Awards for Best Foreign Language Film
 List of Austrian submissions for the Academy Award for Best Foreign Language Film

References

External links
 
 

1989 films
1989 drama films
Austrian drama films
1980s German-language films
Films directed by Michael Haneke
Films set in 1987
Films set in 1988
Films set in 1989
Georges Delerue Award winners
1989 directorial debut films